Nadir Bluff is a bluff (2,355 m) which forms a shoulderlike projection from the east side of Mount Feather in the Quartermain Mountains, Victoria Land. One of a group of names in the area associated with surveying applied in 1993 by New Zealand Geographic Board (NZGB); nadir being opposite of zenith and the direction of gravity as defined by a plumb line.

Cliffs of Victoria Land
Scott Coast